Louis Réau (1 January 1881, Poitiers - 10 June 1961, Paris) was a French art historian. His major contribution involved exploring French art's international influence. His magnum opus, Iconographie de l'Art Chrétien, in six volumes, encompasses all of Europe, including the Eastern Orthodox tradition.

Life and work 

He studied at the École Normale Supérieure in Paris then, until 1908, at the  École Nationale des Langues Orientales Vivantes. He also worked to oppose the growing influence of Germany.

At the beginning of World War I, he was mobilized and served as an interpreter on the Eastern Front, with the 158th Infantry Division. After 1917, he was responsible for the Russian news service at the Ministry of War. Later, he was awarded the Order of Saint Anna.

In 1928, he was placed in charge of a mission to Russia, to establish a catalogue of French art works being held at museums in Moscow and Saint Petersburg. From 1930 to 1938, he was Director of the Institut Français de Vienne, then served as Professor of Medieval art at the Sorbonne; a position he held until 1951. He was elected to the Académie des Beaux-Arts in 1947, becoming the first person to occupy the newly created Seat #11 in the "Unattached" section.

His daughter, was a physician and Africanist.

Sources 
 Brief biography @ the Dictionary of Art Historians
 Biographical data and references from the Comité des travaux historiques et scientifiques @ La France Savante

External links

 Olga Medvedkova, "Scientifique, ou intellectuel ?: Louis Réau et la création de l'Institut français de Saint-Pétersbourg", In: Cahiers du monde russe, 2002, Vol.43 (Online)

1881 births
1961 deaths
French art historians
Institute directors
Members of the Académie des beaux-arts
People from Poitiers